Michael Fabbro (born 10 May 1996) is an Italian footballer who plays as a forward for Serie C club Virtus Verona.

Club career 
He made his professional debut in the Lega Pro for Bassano Virtus on 6 September 2015 in a game against Cremonese.

In April 2018, Serie A club Chievo announced the signing of Fabbro, who would become a free agent on 1 July 2018.

On 2 September 2019 he was loaned to Pisa with an option to buy.

On 31 January 2022, Fabbro returned to Siena.

On 18 October 2022, Fabbro signed with Serie C club Virtus Verona until the end of the season.

International career 
Fabbro represented Italy national under-17 football team at the 2013 FIFA U-17 World Cup.

Career statistics

References

External links
 

1996 births
Living people
People from San Daniele del Friuli
Footballers from Friuli Venezia Giulia
Italian footballers
Association football forwards
Serie B players
Serie C players
A.C. Milan players
Bassano Virtus 55 S.T. players
A.C. ChievoVerona players
A.C.N. Siena 1904 players
Pisa S.C. players
Virtus Verona players
Italy youth international footballers